FK Vrbas is a defunct football club based in Vrbas, Vojvodina, Serbia.

History
FK Vrbas was founded on 27 August 1969 as a result of a merger between two local clubs, OFK Vrbas and FK Kombinat. They subsequently won the Novi Sad-Syrmia Zone League, the fourth tier of Yugoslav football, in their inaugural 1969–70 season, thus earning promotion to the Vojvodina League, the third national tier. In the following two campaigns, the club finished runners-up to Srem (1970–71) and Radnički Sombor (1971–72), before winning first place in both 1972–73 (lost in the promotion playoffs against Dinamo Pančevo) and 1973–74, eventually securing a spot in the Yugoslav Second League. They spent the next two years in the second tier, between 1974 and 1976, before being relegated back to the Vojvodina League. The club again won the Vojvodina League in 1976–77, but immediately suffered relegation from the Second League in 1978. They were promoted back to the second tier of Yugoslav football in 1979, spending two seasons in the league, before being relegated again in 1981. FK Vrbas returned to the Second League in 1983 and stayed for four years until 1987.

Before the final breakup of Yugoslavia, FK Vrbas competed in the 1991–92 Yugoslav Second League. They continued participating in the 1992–93 Second League of FR Yugoslavia, but instantly suffered relegation to the Serbian League North. Later on, the club spent five consecutive seasons in the third tier, before being promoted back to the Second League in 1998. They subsequently played the next six years in the Second League, having been relegated in the 2003–04 campaign. After two successive seasons in the Serbian League Vojvodina, the club was relegated to the Vojvodina League West in 2006. Following the club's relegation to the fifth tier for the first time in its history, FK Vrbas was eventually dissolved on 30 July 2007 by the club board's decision due to financial troubles. Simultaneously, it was announced that the newly formed club, OFK Vrbas, would continue to compete in the Vrbas-Bečej-Titel Intermunicipal League, the sixth tier of Serbian football.

Honours
Vojvodina League (Tier 3)
 1972–73, 1973–74, 1976–77, 1978–79, 1982–83
Novi Sad-Syrmia Zone League (Tier 4)
 1969–70

Notable players
This is a list of players who have played at full international level.
  Goran Kartalija
  Radoslav Batak
  Vojin Lazarević
For a list of all FK Vrbas players with a Wikipedia article, see :Category:FK Vrbas players.

Managerial history

References

External links
 Unofficial website

 
1969 establishments in Serbia
2007 disestablishments in Serbia
Association football clubs disestablished in 2007
Association football clubs established in 1969
Defunct football clubs in Serbia
Football clubs in Vojvodina
Sport in Vrbas, Serbia